Johannes Teutonicus Zemeke (died 1245), also Joannes Simeca Teutonicus and John Zimeke, was a Decretist glossator, best known for his glosses on Gratian's Decretum in collaboration with Bartholomew of Brescia. He also is known for his theory that a woman who had sex with 23,000 men was a prostitute, whether or not she accepted money for the act.

References

1245 deaths
13th-century scholars
Year of birth unknown
13th-century German writers
13th-century Latin writers
Canon law jurists